Sultan "Abdulkadir Isse Ahmed Salah" is the current Sultan of the Ugar Saleban sub-clan of the Majeerteen itself a sub-clan of Darood in Somalia.

See also
Majeerteen Sultanate

References

Living people
Year of birth missing (living people)
Somali sultans
Ethnic Somali people
21st-century Somalian people